James Krishna Floyd (born 27 August 1985) is a British actor. He is known for his roles in My Brother the Devil, Everywhere and Nowhere, the 2022 film The Swimmers, and the TV series The Good Karma Hospital.

In 2013, Floyd was named as a Breakthrough Brit by the British Academy of Film and Television Arts, and won a British Independent Film Award for his role in My Brother the Devil.

Early life
Floyd was born in Kings Cross, London and grew up in North West London with his parents. His mother is an Indian Tamil, and his father is English with Scottish ancestry. Floyd's father was a civil servant, working as a probation officer in such areas as Tottenham and Holloway, and his mother taught English to refugees and Category A prisoners at HM Prison Wormwood Scrubs. James grew up attending plays at the Royal Shakespeare Company, which he later credits as inspiration for his acting career.

Floyd attended the London School of Economics and Political Science (LSE) studying Philosophy, Logic and Scientific Method but left to pursue a career in theatre. He trained at the RADA Youth Summer Program at the Old Vic and later became an alumnus of the National Youth Theatre.

Career

Theatre
Floyd began his career attending open auditions through the National Youth Theatre in London making his stage debut as one of the chorus in Antigone at Hell’s Mouth performed at the Soho Theatre. In 2005, he landed a lead in Totally Practically Naked in My Room on a Wednesday Night performed at the Tristan Bates Theatre. Despite this, he struggled for many years to make ends meet, working as an usher at the Strand Theatre and teaching maths to young students while auditioning.

In 2007, Floyd starred as a young alcoholic indigenous Canadian in J.B. Priestley’s play The Glass Cage at the Royal & Derngate theatre, directed by Laurie Sansom. And in 2008, he played Ali, a Pakistani student from Detroit in Anna Ziegler’s Dov and Ali at Theatre503.

Film
Floyd’s first starring film role was the 2011 coming-of-age drama Everywhere and Nowhere, in which he played a British Pakistani teenager who has a passion for music and DJing. The film played to stellar reviews at the Mumbai Film Festival and Dinard Film Festival, and was released in the UK, Europe, and the Middle East.

In 2012, Floyd starred in the 2013 drama My Brother the Devil, a tale of two British-Egyptian brothers growing up on a tough council estate in Hackney, East London. It was Sally El Hosaini’s debut film as a writer/director, and Floyd starred as "Rash", a young drug-dealing boxer with a secret. To prepare for the role, Floyd spent five months living with Hackney gang members and training as a boxer in order to “to get my head around how these guys really think and feel.” After his performance, Time Out reported that Floyd “be on every director’s must-cast list.” Later that year, he signed with United Talent Agency in Los Angeles.

In 2015, Floyd played the lead role of Alex Harks, an American orphan caught up in a private spy ring in the thriller Rogue Agent, executive produced by Brian Kavanaugh-Jones and co-starring Anthony LaPaglia. In 2017, Floyd co-starred as a rags-to-riches British Indian businessman in British noir City of Tiny Lights along- side Riz Ahmed, Billie Piper and Cush Jumbo. The film was directed by Pete Travis and produced by Rebecca O’Brien.

Television 
In 2007 Floyd played the role of footballer Miguel Lopez in the British TV series Dream Team. In 2009 he appeared in the TV Film Compulsion (based on Jacobean tragedy The Changeling), alongside Ray Winstone and Parminder Nagra. In 2012 he appeared as a Spanish bullfighter in Seville set crime series Falcón for Sky Atlantic. He portrayed Freddie Mercury in the 2013 BAFTA-winning BBC biopic The Best Possible Taste. In 2016, he starred as Ishbaal, prince of the Israelites, in the ABC drama Of Kings and Prophets. Since February 2017, Floyd has starred as the Indian doctor Gabriel Varma in the ITV series The Good Karma Hospital.

As of late 2019 Floyd is filming a lead role in new Middle-East set drama Fertile Crescent for Hulu. The 8-episode series was finally also released September 2020 as No Man's Land on Arte-tv in France. Arte-tv in Germany gave it the title Kampf um den Halbmond and released it as Web-stream.

Personal life 
Floyd lives in London. He has a son, who was born in 2016. In October 2017, James added his middle name Krishna to his official stage name. Floyd supports a number of charities, including Kiva, It Gets Better Project, and the Disasters Emergency Committee.

Awards 

 Screen International Star of Tomorrow (2012)
 Most Promising Newcomer, British Independent Film Award (2012)
 Best Male Actor, Milano Film Festival (2012)
 BAFTA Breakthrough Brit (2013)

Filmography

Theatre 

The Glass Cage at the Royal & Derngate
Dov & Ali at Theatre503
Totally Practically Naked... at the Tristan Bates Theatre
Antigone at Hell's Mouth at the Soho Theatre

Film

Television

References

External links
 

1985 births
Living people
Alumni of the London School of Economics
British male actors of Indian descent
English people of Indian descent
English people of Scottish descent
English people of Tamil descent
English male film actors
English male stage actors
English male television actors
Male actors from London
National Youth Theatre members
People educated at University College School
People from Kings Cross, London